AquaDuck (on the Disney Wish as AquaMouse) is a water coaster (a water slide with similar turns, drops and g-forces to a roller coaster) that is located on the deck of two Disney cruise ships. It was first constructed on the Disney Dream in January 2011 and then later on the Disney Fantasy in February 2012, and the ride opened on the Disney Wish as AquaMouse on July 14, 2022.

History
Disney Cruise Line announced the development of the first two ships to have an AquaDuck in 2007. Construction commenced of the first ship on March 2, 2009. Both ships were constructed by Meyer Werft in Papenburg, Germany, Disney Dream was complete in early 2011, followed by Disney Fantasy in early 2012, and followed by the Disney Wish under the AquaMouse name in July 2022.

Design 
AquaDuck is 765 foot long and exists on 46 foot tall stilts. The AquaDuck captures the mechanics of a roller coaster and combines them with the physical attributes of a water slide. The coaster is made of a transparent acrylic material, much like a clear plastic, that most waterslides in resorts and theme parks are made of. Within the acrylic tube, water jets are used for uphill propulsion, a similar concept to conveyor belts on roller coasters. It is themed to Donald Duck's nephews. On April 29, 2021, Disney Cruise Line announced that the ride was constructed on the Disney Wish under the name AquaMouse. The slide features 760 feet of winding tubes suspended above the upper decks of the Disney Wish. The AquaMouse is themed to the Disney+ original series The Wonderful World of Mickey Mouse, and billed as the "first-ever Disney attraction at sea".

References

External links
 Aquaduck
 The Aquaduck Disney Dream
 First-Ever Onboard Water Coaster

Water rides
Disney Cruise Line
Walt Disney Parks and Resorts attractions
Donald Duck